Cuckoo is a small unincorporated community in Louisa County, Virginia, United States. It is located about eight miles southeast of Louisa, roughly between Charlottesville and Richmond. The Cuckoo Tavern stood nearby, which in 1781 was the beginning of Jack Jouett's ride to warn the Colonists of the arrival of Banastre Tarleton's British cavalry (similar to Paul Revere's Ride). There was also a large house named Cuckoo built in 1819 for Henry Pendleton on the former property of William Overton Callis. A historical marker is at the spot. Its post office  has been closed.

The tavern was named for the cuckoo clock on the wall, supposedly one of the first in Virginia.

George Jackson, the father of Shirley Ann Jackson, American nuclear physicist and President of Rensselaer Polytechnic Institute, was a native of Cuckoo.

Earthquakes 

On Tuesday August 23, 2011, at 1:51 PM ET a magnitude 5.8 earthquake was recorded 2.4 mi (3.9 km) SW of Cuckoo on the western bank of Indian Creek.  It was felt from Atlanta, Georgia to Quebec City, Quebec, Canada and as far west as Cincinnati, Ohio.

References

External links 
Historical marker
Photo of the Cuckoo house

Unincorporated communities in Louisa County, Virginia
Unincorporated communities in Virginia